The Sigiswanger Horn (also Sigiswangerhorn) is part of the Hörner group in the Allgäu Alps. It reaches a height of 1,527 m and rises between Bolsterlang and Ofterschwang. Like its neighbour, the Rangiswanger Horn, it belongs geologically to the flysch mountains of the Anterior Hörner group (Vordere Hörnergruppe), with their numerous boggy meadows and species-rich forested ravines.

Description 
The Sigiswanger Horn is "a rarely visited summit, covered in forest". The summit of this "Horn" may be climbed in a few minutes from the Panorama Way on the so-called Allgäu Hörner Tour, which runs between the Ofterschwanger Horn and the Weiherkopf. Only a mossy cairn adorns the summit of the Sigiswanger Horn. When approaching from the north this peak is the second of four on the Hörner tour. The Hörner tour is a route that used both in summer as well as in winter (e.g. with snowshoes). In winter the route is neither waymarked nor signed, however.

North of the Sigiswanger Horn is the Fahnengehrenalpe (1,329 m), to the east the Schwingundalpe (1,078 m) and the Kahlrückenalpe (1,189 m) and, to the south, the Sigiswangerhornalpe (1,407 m).

The Sigiswanger Horn is named after the village of Sigiswang, which lies at the eastern foot of the mountain. Sigiswang is part of the municipality of Ofterschwang. According to Thaddäus Steiner the first half of the place name of Sigiswang goes back to the Old German personal name, Sigi. In early 19th century maps it was still written Siegeswanger Horn.

Literature and maps

Walking guides 
 Sigiswangerhorn, in: Dieter Seibert, Allgäuer Alpen alpin, Alpine Club Guide, Munich, 2004, 16th edn., p. 145,

Maps 
 Alpine Club map Bayerische Alpen, Allgäuer Voralpen West: Nagelfluhkette, Hörnergruppe, Wegmarkierung und Skirouten, BY 1, 1st edn., 2012, 1:25,000 map series, publ. by the German Alpine Club, 
 Bavarian State Office for Survey and Geoinformation, UK L 8, Allgäuer Alpen, area map, scale 1 : 50,000, Bavarian State Survey Office, Munich,

References 

One-thousanders of Germany
Mountains of the Alps
Mountains of Bavaria
Allgäu Alps
Oberallgäu